The 2000 British Open was a professional ranking snooker tournament, that was held from 1–8 October 2000 at the Plymouth Pavilions, Plymouth, England.
 
Peter Ebdon won the tournament by defeating Jimmy White nine frames to six in the final. The defending champion, Stephen Hendry, was defeated by Alan McManus in the quarter-final.


Main draw

Final

References

British Open (snooker)
British Open
Open (snooker)
British Open